The Battle of Mine Run, also known as Payne's Farm, or New Hope Church, or the Mine Run campaign (November 27 – December 2, 1863), was conducted in Orange County, Virginia, in the American Civil War.

An unsuccessful attempt of the Union Army of the Potomac to defeat the Confederate Army of Northern Virginia, it was marked by false starts and low casualties and ended hostilities in the Eastern Theater for the year.

Background

After the Battle of Gettysburg in July, Confederate Gen. Robert E. Lee and his command retreated back across the Potomac River into Virginia. Union commander Maj. Gen. George G. Meade was widely criticized for failing to pursue aggressively and defeat Lee's army. Meade planned new offensives in Virginia for the fall. His first attempt was a series of inconclusive duels and maneuvers in October and November known as the Bristoe campaign.

In late November, Meade attempted to steal a march through the Wilderness of Spotsylvania and strike the right flank of the Confederate Army south of the Rapidan River. Meade had intelligence reports that Lee's army, half the size of Meade's Army of the Potomac (actually 48,000 to Meade's 81,000), was split in two, separated by Clark's Mountain, with the two flanks anchored at Mine Run and Liberty Mills, over thirty miles apart. His plan was to cross the Rapidan at points beyond Maj. Gen. J.E.B. Stuart's cavalry screen, overwhelm the right flank (Lt. Gen. Richard S. Ewell's Second Corps) and then follow up with the remainder (Lt. Gen. A.P. Hill's Third Corps).

Unlike Maj. Gen. Joseph Hooker's plan in the Chancellorsville campaign earlier that year on essentially the same ground, Meade planned no diversions; he intended a lightning strike with his entire army. The army marched on November 25 and got off to a good start, aided by fog on Clark's Mountain, which screened his movements from Confederate lookouts. However, Maj. Gen. William H. French's III Corps got mired in fording the river at Jacob's Ford, causing traffic jams when they moved their artillery to Germanna Ford, where other units were attempting to cross.

Opposing forces

Union

Confederate

Battle
Speed had escaped Meade, who was furious with French, and this allowed Lee time to react. Lee ordered Maj. Gen. Jubal A. Early, in temporary command of Ewell's Second Corps, to march east on the Orange Turnpike to Locust Grove, where Early's men began skirmishing with advance Union elements. Maj. Gen. Edward "Allegheny" Johnson's division was marching along the Raccoon Ford Road to join Early when the head of Gen. French's III Corps made contact in the heavy wooded terrain along the Widow Morris Road. Johnson turned his division about and ordered what can only be described as a reckless double-envelopment assault against a mostly unseen enemy of unknown strength, throwing his 5,500 men against French and John Sedgwick's VI Corps (a combined 32,000). It was about 3:45 - 4:00 p.m. Johnson's assault fell apart quickly on the left, where Steuart lost control of his brigade, and quickly bogged down in the middle (Stonewall Brigade) and on the right (Stafford and Jones), but was strong enough to slow down the Union advance until nightfall, when Johnson left the field on his own accord, retreating with the rest of the army west behind the Mine Run Creek. The actual fighting consumed less than two and one-half hours and the losses were heavy. Johnson lost nearly 550 men (or 10% of his strength) and French's corps about 950 from all causes. The Battle of Payne's Farm was short, bloody, and important. Johnson's attack put French and his III Corps back on its heels, slowed the advance, and saved Lee's army. If Johnson had cleared the Widow Morris Road before the arrival of French and Sedgwick, or had been driven away in defeat, the 32,000 Federals could have marched behind Lee's left flank and into his rear.

After dark, Lee withdrew to prepared field fortifications along Mine Run. The next day the Union Army closed on the Confederate position. Meade planned a heavy artillery bombardment followed by Maj. Gen. Gouverneur K. Warren's II Corps attack in the south, then Maj. Gen. John Sedgwick's VI Corps in the north an hour later. Lee planned an assault for December 2 that would have exploited the dangling left flank of the Union line, discovered the previous day by Maj. Gen. Wade Hampton's cavalry. Although the Union bombardment began on schedule, the major attack did not materialize; Meade concluded that the Confederate line was too strong to attack (although Warren is credited with getting the attack canceled) and retired during the night of December 1–2, ending the fall campaign. Lee was chagrined to find he had no one left in his front to attack.

Aftermath
The Army of the Potomac went into winter quarters at Brandy Station, Virginia. Mine Run had been Meade's final opportunity to plan a strategic offensive before the arrival of Ulysses S. Grant as general-in-chief the following spring. Lee also regretted the inconclusive results. He was quoted as saying, "I am too old to command this army. We never should have permitted those people to get away." Confederate hopes of repeating their Chancellorsville triumph had been dashed.
The Mine Run Campaign was Meade's last and failed attempt in 1863 to destroy Lee's Army of Northern Virginia before winter halted military operations.

Henry Wadsworth Longfellow wrote the 1863 poem "Christmas Bells", which became the carol "I Heard the Bells on Christmas Day", in response to learning of his son Charles Appleton Longfellow being severely wounded in the battle.

Battlefield preservation
Attorney, historian, and publisher Theodore P. Savas, together with Paul Sacra of Richmond, Virginia, set out to locate and map the Payne's Farm battlefield in the early 1990s. Savas believed published articles and books had incorrectly located the fighting area and was determined to test his theory. Armed with extensive primary sources and battle reports, he and Sacra located what they believed was the field and, with the permission from several landowners, used metal detectors to prove it. Within a couple days Savas and Sacra had unearthed hundreds of artifacts, including bullets, a ramrod, bayonet socket, a partial harmonica, belt buckles, buttons, and much more. Savas drew maps of the field and the general location of the artifacts and delivered them to The Association for the Preservation of Civil War Sites (or APCWS), and its director, A. Wilson Greene, in Fredericksburg, Virginia. Greene, who had no idea the field was in such pristine condition, was excited by the find and affirmed its importance. Saving the land was a slow process for a variety of reasons, including the fact that the majority landowner wanted to develop the land. At that point, Savas and Sacra presented him with proof that the land contained at least one mass grave (which they had not detected or recovered anything from), and that to develop it would be a travesty. The Civil War Trust (a division of the American Battlefield Trust) and its partners later acquired and preserved  of the battlefield. The battlefield today features a wooded, 1.5-mile interpretive trail with historical wayside markers. It is located on Virginia highway 611 across from the Zoar Baptist Church about two miles north of Locust Grove.

Notes

References
 Eicher, David J. The Longest Night: A Military History of the Civil War. New York: Simon & Schuster, 2001. .
 Esposito, Vincent J. West Point Atlas of American Wars. New York: Frederick A. Praeger, 1959. . The collection of maps (without explanatory text) is available online at the West Point website.
 Salmon, John S. The Official Virginia Civil War Battlefield Guide. Mechanicsburg, PA: Stackpole Books, 2001. .
 National Park Service battle description

Further reading
 Gottfried, Bradley M. The Maps of the Bristoe Station and Mine Run Campaigns: An Atlas of the Battles and Movements in the Eastern Theater after Gettysburg, Including Rappahannock Station, Kelly's Ford, and Morton's Ford, July 1863 - February 1864. Savas Beatie, 2013.
 Graham, Martin F., and George F. Skoch. Mine Run: A Campaign of Lost Opportunities, October 21, 1863–May 1, 1864. Lynchburg, VA: H. E. Howard, 1987. .
 Mackowski, Chris. The Great Battle Never Fought: The Mine Run Campaign, November 26–December 2, 1863. Emerging Civil War Series. El Dorado Hills, CA: Savas Beatie, 2018. .

External links
Mine Run Campaign in Encyclopedia Virginia

 

1863 in Virginia
Mine Run
Mine Run
Mine Run
Orange County, Virginia
Mine Run
Mine Run
November 1863 events
December 1863 events